Gohaliabari Union is a union of Kalihati Upazila, Tangail District, Bangladesh. It is situated 30 km north of Tangail, The District Headquarter.

Demographics
According to the 2011 Bangladesh census, Gohaliabari Union had 5,062 households and a population of 23,824.

The literacy rate (age 7 and over) was 40.2% (Male-44.4%, Female-36%).

See also
 Union Councils of Tangail District

References

Populated places in Dhaka Division
Populated places in Tangail District
Unions of Kalihati Upazila